Rise Up is the first studio album by American Christian country band Cain. The album was released on May 7, 2021, by Provident Label Group. The album was produced by Nick Schwarz, David Leonard, Brad King, Seth Talley, Jonathan Smith, Jeff Pardo, Bryan Fowler, and Jordan Mohilowski.

The album has been supported by the release of "Rise Up (Lazarus)", "Yes He Can", "The Commission", and "I'm So Blessed" as singles. The title track, "Rise Up (Lazarus)", peaked at number four on the Hot Christian Songs chart. "Yes He Can" peaked at number five on the Hot Christian Songs chart. "The Commission" peaked at number two on the Hot Christian Songs chart. "I'm So Blessed" peaked at number four on the Hot Christian Songs chart.

Rise Up peaked at number six on Billboards Top Christian Albums Chart in the United States. Rise Up received two GMA Dove Award nominations for Pop/Contemporary Album of the Year and Recorded Music Packaging of the Year at the 2022 GMA Dove Awards.

Background
Cain made their debut on Provident Label Group with the release of their self-titled extended play in March 2020, and the release of their single "Rise Up (Lazarus)" to Christian radio. The trio then released multiple covers of songs as standalone singles for songs such as "Egypt" by Bethel Music and Cory Asbury, "There Was Jesus" by Zach Williams and Dolly Parton, and "Celebrate Me Home" by Kenny Loggins. In April 2021, Cain announced that Rise Up will be their first full-length album, containing tracks previously released on their debut EP as well as new tracks.

Release and promotion

Singles
"Rise Up (Lazarus)" was released to Christian radio in the United States as the lead single from the album on April 17, 2020. "Rise Up (Lazarus)" peaked at number four on the US Hot Christian Songs chart.

"Yes He Can" was released to Christian radio in the United States as the second single from the album on April 16, 2021. "Yes He Can" peaked at number four on the US Hot Christian Songs chart.

"The Commission" was released  as the third single from the album on December 11, 2021. The song impacted Christian radio in the United States on December 31, 2021. "The Commission" peaked at number two on the US Hot Christian Songs chart.

"I'm So Blessed" impacted Christian radio in the United States on July 15, 2022, becoming the fourth single from the album. "I'm So Blessed" peaked at number four on the US Hot Christian Songs chart.

Reception

Critical response

Joshua Andre in his 365 Days of Inspiring Media review opined that Rise Up is "one of my favourite albums of the year thus far, in terms of enthusiasm and accessibility and lyrical poignancy; CAIN is definitely for fans of artists like I Am They and Rend Collective." Timothy Yap of JubileeCast had mixed reactions of the album, ultimately concluding that "Rise Up is a welcoming debut. The bright and uplifting tunes, the catchy pop choruses, and the siblings fine harmonies make Rise Up a noteworthy record among the sea of new releases."

Accolades

Commercial performance
In the United States, Rise Up debuted at number 20 on the Billboard Top Christian Albums chart dated May 22, 2021.

Track listing

Charts

Weekly charts

Year-end charts

Release history

References

External links
  on PraiseCharts

2021 albums